Forcer can mean:
 the active, typically the moving, part of a linear motor
 one of two people known as Francis Forcer